The following is a list of awards and nominations received by Gillian Anderson.

Anderson, who achieved critical acclaim for starring as Dana Scully in The X-Files, is a Primetime Emmy Award winning actress. She won the Primetime Emmy Award for Outstanding Lead Actress in a Drama Series award in 1997. She was nominated another three times for this role. In 2006, She was nominated Outstanding Lead Actress in a Miniseries or a Movie for her portrayal of Lady Dedlock in Bleak House and most recently, won the Outstanding Supporting Actress in a Drama Series for her turn as Margaret Thatcher on The Crown. Anderson won the Golden Globe Award for Best Actress – Television Series Drama in 1997 for her role as FBI Special Agent Dana Scully in The X-Files and again in 2021 for Best Supporting Actress – Series, Miniseries or TV Movie (The Crown). She was nominated another three times for the role and once more in the Best Actress – Miniseries or Television Film for Bleak House. She won three Screen Actors Guild Awards for Outstanding Performance by a Female Actor in a Drama Series (in 1996, 1997 and 2021), one for Outstanding Performance by an Ensemble in a Drama Series (in 2021) and was nominated total of eleven times.

Anderson was nominated for the BAFTA TV Award twice: in 2006, as Best Actress on Television for Bleak House and in 2011, for Best Supporting Actress on Television for her portrayal of Wallis Simpson in Any Human Heart. For her portrayal of Lily Bart in The House of Mirth (2000) Anderson won the British Independent Film Award for Best Actress.

Anderson has also received accolades for her stage performances. She won the Theatre World Award for Best Newcomer for Absent Friends (1991). She was nominated for a Laurence Olivier Award for Best Actress for her performance in Ibsen's A Doll's House (2009). For her portrayal of Blanche DuBois in A Streetcar Named Desire (2014, 2016) she won the Evening Standard Theatre Award for Best Actress and earned her second Laurence Olivier Award nomination for Best Actress. In 2019, she received her third Laurence Olivier Award nomination for portraying Margo Channing in the stage production of All About Eve.

In 2016, Anderson was appointed an honorary Officer of the Most Excellent Order of the British Empire (OBE) for her services to drama. In 2018, she received a star on the Hollywood Walk of Fame.

Motion picture awards

Blockbuster Entertainment Awards

British Independent Film Awards

Chlotrudis Awards

Irish Film and Television Awards

Satellite Awards

Saturn Awards

Television awards

Aftonbladet TV Prize

BAFTA TV Awards

Bravo Otto

Broadcasting Press Guild Awards

C21 International Drama Awards

Crime Thriller Awards

Fangoria Chainsaw Awards

Golden Globe Awards

Golden Nymph Awards

Kids' Choice Awards

National Television Awards

Pan-American Association of Film & Television Journalists Awards

People's Choice Awards

Primetime Emmy Awards

Roma Fiction Fest's Artistic Excellence Award

Satellite Awards

Saturn Awards

Sci-Fi Universe Awards

Screen Actors Guild Awards

SFX Awards

Sichuan TV Festival – International Gold Panda Awards for TV Drama

TV Guide Awards

Viewers for Quality Television Awards

Critic awards

Critics' Choice Television Awards

London Critics Circle Film Awards

National Society of Film Critics Awards

New York Film Critics Circle Awards

Television Critics Association Awards

Toronto Film Critics Association Awards

Village Voice Film Poll Awards

Theatre Awards

Broadway World: UK Awards

Evening Standard Theatre Awards

Laurence Olivier Awards

Theatre World Awards

WhatsonStage.com Awards

Special awards

Audie Awards

Harper's Bazaar Women of the Year Awards

Glamour Awards

Webby Awards

References

External links
 
 

Anderson, Gillian